Velké Dářko is the largest pond (fish pond) in the Vysočina Region of the Czech Republic.  Its surface area is about 2.06 km² at an elevation of 610 m. The pond is located 10 km from Žďár nad Sázavou.

Artificial lakes of the Czech Republic
Geography of the Vysočina Region
Žďár nad Sázavou District
Fish ponds